This is a list of Taiwanese superlatives.

Geography

Ecology

Demography

Structures

References 

Taiwanese
Superlatives